The Federal House in Greensburg, Kentucky, in Green County, Kentucky, was listed on the National Register of Historic Places in 1985.
 
It is located prominently at S. Main and E. Columbia in Greensburg.  It is Federal in style.  It was probably built between 1826 and 1850.

It is a two-story, five-bay brick central passage plan house, with brick laid in Flemish bond.  Its interior includes simple Federal style mantels. It was described in 1984 as "one of the best examples in the county of Federal style architecture."

References

National Register of Historic Places in Green County, Kentucky
Federal architecture in Kentucky
Houses completed in 1826
Houses on the National Register of Historic Places in Kentucky
Central-passage houses
Houses in Green County, Kentucky
Greensburg, Kentucky
1826 establishments in Kentucky